Roshy Augustine (born 20 January 1969) is an Indian politician serving as the Member of the Legislative Assembly (M.L.A.) of the Kerala Legislative Assembly from Idukki since 2001. He is part of the Kerala Congress (M) party and is the current Minister for Irrigation, Command Area Development Authority, Ground Water Department, Water Supply and Sanitation Government of Kerala since 20 May 2021, under Pinarayi Vijayan's second term cabinet.

Personal life
He was born to Augustine Thomas and Leelamma on 20 January 1969 at Pala. He started his political career from his school level. He was the leader of Edakkoli Government High School Parliament, Unit President of Kerala Students Congress (M) in St. Thomas College, Pala, state general secretary and president of Kerala Students Congress (M), member of Kerala State Legal Aid and Advisory Board and director board member of Ramapuram Service Co-Operative Bank. Currently, he is the general secretary of Kerala Congress (M).

Political career
Roshy Augustine entered politics while he was still a student and soon became the leader of the Edakkoli Government High School Parliament. He graduated with a BSc in Physics from St. Thomas College Pala affiliated to M.G. University Kottayam in 1990–9. He had held different positions in K.S.C. (M) such as college Unit President, St Thomas College, Palai; State General Secretary and President K.S.C.(M); Member, Kerala State Legal Aid and advisory board; Director Board Member, Ramapuram Service Co-operative Bank. His notable acts include 'Vimochana Padayathra' in which he led 43 days long rally from Kasaragod to Thiruvananthapuram in 1995 and 'Vimochana Yatra' in 2001 to awaken the people of Kerala against corruption, alcoholism and moral degeneration. He is serving as a Minister for Irrigation, Command Area Development Authority, Ground Water Department, Water Supply and Sanitation, in the Pinarayi Vijayan Government from 20 May 2021 onwards .

Assembly election candidature history

References

External links

Kerala Congress (M) politicians
Malayali politicians
Living people
1969 births
People from Pala, Kerala
Kerala MLAs 2001–2006
Kerala MLAs 2006–2011
Kerala MLAs 2011–2016
Kerala MLAs 2016–2021
Kerala MLAs 2021–2026